Alexandre Clot (born 9 September 1972) is a retired Swiss football midfielder.

References

1972 births
Living people
Swiss men's footballers
FC Sion players
FC Schaffhausen players
Association football midfielders
Swiss Super League players